Magdalena of Austria (German: Magdalena von Österreich; 14 August 1532 – 10 September 1590) was a co-founder and first abbess of the Ladies' Convent of Hall (Haller Damenstift), born an archduchess of Austria from the House of Habsburg as the daughter of Ferdinand I, Holy Roman Emperor.

Life

Early life 
Archduchess Magdalena of Austria was born on 14 August 1531 as the sixth child and fourth daughter of Ferdinand I, Holy Roman Emperor (1503–1564) and his wife, born Princess Anna of Bohemia and Hungary (1503–1547). She had a strict, religious upbringing with a heavy influence from Jesuits.

Life as an abbess 
Archduchess Magdalena and her younger sister Margaret had long expressed a desire to remain unmarried and create a community of pious women, which their father had a difficult time accepting. After his death in 1564, Magdalena took a vow of celibacy and founded the Ladies' Convent of Hall (Haller Damenstift) in Hall in Tirol, County of Tyrol, a place for like-minded women to lead a reclusive, pious and God-fearing lives under the supervision of the Society of Jesus.

She became the first abbess of the new convent where she was joined by her younger sisters Archduchesses Margaret (1536–1567) and Helena (1543–1574) of Austria. Magdalena died on 10 September 1590 at the age of  58 after a short sickness. She was buried in the Jesuit Church (Jesuitenkirche) in Hall in Tirol. In 1706, her remains were transferred to the church of the convent.

Ancestors

References

1532 births
1590 deaths
Roman Catholic abbesses
16th-century House of Habsburg
16th-century Austrian women
16th-century Roman Catholic nuns
Daughters of emperors
Austrian princesses
Bohemian princesses
Hungarian princesses
Children of Ferdinand I, Holy Roman Emperor
Daughters of kings
People from Innsbruck
Austrian Roman Catholic religious sisters and nuns